The term runaway electrons (RE) is used to denote electrons that undergo free fall acceleration into the realm of relativistic particles. REs may be classified as thermal (lower energy) or relativistic. The study of runaway electrons is thought to be fundamental to our understanding of High-Energy Atmospheric Physics. They are also seen in tokamak fusion devices, where they can damage the reactors.

Lightning
Runaway electrons are the core element of the runaway breakdown based theory of lightning propagation. Since C.T.R. Wilson's work in 1925, research has been conducted to study the possibility of runaway electrons, cosmic ray based or otherwise, initiating the processes required to generate lightning.

Extraterrestrial Occurrence
Electron runaway based lightning may be occurring on the four jovian planets in addition to earth. Simulated studies predict runaway breakdown processes are likely to occur on these gaseous planets far more easily on earth, as the threshold for runaway breakdown to begin is far smaller.

High Energy Plasma
The runaway electron phenomenon has been observed in high energy plasmas. They can pose a threat to machines and experiments in which these plasmas exist, including ITER. Several studies exist examining the properties of runaway electrons in these environments (tokamak), searching to better suppress the detrimental effects of these unwanted runaway electrons.

Computer and Numerical Simulations
This highly complex phenomenon has proved difficult to model with traditional systems, but has been modelled in part with the world's most powerful supercomputer.
In addition, aspects of electron runaway have been simulated using the popular particle physics modelling module Geant4.

Space Based Experiments
 TARANIS (CNES)
 ASIM (ESA)

References

Particle physics